The Crimson Wing may refer to:

The Crimson Wing: Mystery of the Flamingos, a 2008 nature documentary 
The Crimson Wing (1915 film), a silent film directed by E. H. Calvert